Mycobacterium peregrinum is a species of Mycobacterium.

References

External links	
Type strain of Mycobacterium peregrinum at BacDive -  the Bacterial Diversity Metadatabase

peregrinum